Laurel Rose Willson (August 18, 1941 – April 8, 2002) was an American con artist. She authored books alleging Satanic ritual abuse (SRA), and later assumed the guise of a Holocaust survivor.

Early life
Willson was born in Tacoma, Washington in 1941 to Marrian E. Disbrow. She was eventually adopted as an infant by Frank Cole Willson and his wife, schoolteacher Rose Gray Willson.  She had one sister, five years older, named Willow Nell. A gifted musician from a young age, Willson learned to play the piano, clarinet, and flute. After college, Willson worked as a public-school music teacher. She later resided in Bakersfield, California for a number of years, becoming known within evangelical Christian churches there as a vocalist and pianist.

She made allegations that she was psychologically and physically tortured from the ages of four until her early twenties. According to her, at the age of six her adoptive mother allowed a laborer to rape her in lieu of paying for services, and by the age of eight she was supposedly forced into pornography and bestiality. 

Willson's older sister, in a signed affidavit, noted:My parents were devout Christians. They were both active members of the Bible Presbyterian Church in Tacoma. Both of them were fully committed to the Lord Jesus Christ. My sister and I were raised in a very sheltered, strict Christian home. There was no place in our home for anything remotely occult or pornographic. My mother continues as a dedicated Christian...

Satanic ritual abuse allegations
Under the name "Lauren Stratford", Willson wrote three books, the most infamous of which was Satan's Underground, purporting to tell a true story of her upbringing as a baby breeder (for sacrifices) in a satanic cult. Willson had also claimed to have first-hand knowledge of high-profile cases of alleged Satanic ritual abuse (including the child abuse cases in Kern County, where she resided), but her claims were dismissed by investigators as unreliable and fabricated. Willson, along with Michelle Smith (co-author of equally fictional Michelle Remembers), was featured on an episode of Oprah Winfrey's eponymous show in 1989, where Winfrey touted both stories as being unimpeachable fact.

An investigation by Bob and Gretchen Passantino and Jon Trott in the Christian magazine Cornerstone discovered Stratford's real name and family background, and that her stories of abuse were false. In interviews with Willson's family and former associates, it was revealed that Willson had a long history of mental illness and making false allegations of abuse. She repeatedly threatened suicide and practiced self-mutilation and was reportedly hospitalized over forty times. She attracted the attention and sympathy of evangelical author Johanna Michaelsen, one of the most influential promoters of the Satanic moral panic of the period. While living with Michaelsen, Willson falsely claimed to have given birth to three children as a result of rape; two were allegedly killed in snuff films, and the third was supposedly sacrificed in her presence at a Satanic ritual. 

Cornerstone found no evidence that she had ever been pregnant or adopted a child, and when initially posed questions to her publisher, were told that they had documentation to prove the claims. The authors eventually determined that the publisher had done nothing to verify the allegations. In February of 1990, Harvest House Publishing "ceased publication" of Willson's books. 

As of 2022, Satan's Underground (with the author listed as Lauren Stratford) is still available from Pelican Publishing Company, which lists an incorrect and fictional description, and failing to note her death. 

After her books were withdrawn from sale, Willson legally changed her name to Lauren Stratford.

She was also briefly involved in the McMartin preschool trial, claiming to have witnessed and stopped the abuses. She also claimed to have been involved in an ongoing lesbian relationship with Virginia McMartin.

False identity as a Holocaust survivor
She would later create another false identity in 1999, using the surname of her Polish-Catholic maternal grandparents. Pretending to be Laura Grabowski, a Jewish survivor of Auschwitz-Birkenau, Willson collected thousands of dollars in donations intended for Holocaust survivors. Willson assumed the identity of an orphan who was sent to an orphanage in Kraków after Auschwitz and was adopted in America in the mid-1950s. She claimed to be a victim of the infamous Nazi doctor Josef Mengele, alleging experiments that rendered her infertile and the chemical injections blinded her eyes irrevocably. When pressed for specifics regarding her time at the camps, she was unable to provide dates, times or names.

Willson made a claim with the Swiss Fund for victim compensation for Holocaust survivors, using her assumed identity but with the Social Security Number of her true identity, Willson.  Willson befriended Binjamin Wilkomirski, claiming to remember him from the camps, even going so far as to go on lecture engagements together to recount their story. Wilkomirski (real name Bruno Grosjean) later was revealed to be neither Jewish nor a Holocaust survivor, aiding in the exposure of Willson as a fraud.

Cornerstone once again published an exposé of Laurel's real identity.

See also
 Michelle Remembers
 Robert Passantino

References 

1941 births
2002 deaths
Writers from Bakersfield, California
Impostors
Crimes involving Satanism or the occult

Literary forgeries
Hoaxes in the United States
Writers from Washington (state)
American adoptees
Seattle Pacific University alumni
University of Redlands alumni
1999 hoaxes
Satanic ritual abuse hysteria in the United States
Holocaust-related hoaxes